In the Newman–Penrose (NP) formalism of general relativity,  independent components of the Ricci tensors  of a four-dimensional spacetime are encoded into seven (or ten) Ricci scalars which consist of three real scalars  , three (or six) complex scalars  and the NP curvature scalar . Physically, Ricci-NP scalars are related with the energy–momentum distribution of the spacetime due to Einstein's field equation.

Definitions

  

Remark I: In these definitions,  could be replaced by its trace-free part  or by the Einstein tensor  because of the normalization (i.e. inner product) relations that

Remark II: Specifically for electrovacuum, we have , thus

and therefore  is reduced to

Remark III: If one adopts the convention , the definitions of  should take the opposite values; that is to say,  after the signature transition.

Alternative derivations

According to the definitions above, one should find out the Ricci tensors before calculating the Ricci-NP scalars via contractions with the corresponding tetrad vectors. However, this method fails to fully reflect the spirit of Newman–Penrose formalism and alternatively, one could compute the spin coefficients and then derive the Ricci-NP scalars  via relevant NP field equations that

while the NP curvature scalar  could be directly and easily calculated via  with  being the ordinary scalar curvature of the spacetime metric .

Electromagnetic Ricci-NP scalars

Moreover, for electromagnetic field, in addition to the aforementioned definitions,  could be determined more specifically by

where  denote the three complex Maxwell-NP scalars which encode the six independent components of the Faraday-Maxwell 2-form   (i.e. the electromagnetic field strength tensor)

Remark: The equation  for electromagnetic field is however not necessarily valid for other kinds of matter fields.
For example, in the case of Yang–Mills fields there will be   where  are Yang–Mills-NP scalars.

See also
Newman–Penrose formalism
Weyl scalar

References

General relativity